Devapala may refer to:

 Devapala (Pala dynasty), ruled Bengal region of India and Bangladesh during 9th century
 Devapala (Paramara dynasty), ruled Malwa region of central India during c. 1218-1239 CE